Niphona lateraliplagiata is a species of beetle in the family Cerambycidae. It was described by Stephan von Breuning and Itzinger in 1943. It is known from Myanmar, China and Vietnam.

References

lateraliplagiata
Beetles described in 1943